Biotechnia Ellinikon Trikyklon (Βιοτεχνία Ελληνικών Τρίκυκλων, "Greek Three-Wheeler Manufacturer"), or BET, was a small vehicle manufacturer founded in Athens by Petros Konstantinou. It was one of several manufacturers - the first appearing in the early 1940s - that converted BMW or other motorcycles into light utility three-wheelers. In 1965 it entirely designed and built a small five-seat passenger car with a BMW 125cc motorcycle engine. Although the type was certified, only one was built due to problems in availability of parts for further production. Following this design, three-wheeled truck models were developed and produced. A second passenger car model was designed and introduced in 1973, known as model 500, with a Fiat 500cc engine. With metal body, seating up to five passengers and featuring very good road handling, it was a rather advanced three-wheeler for its time. It was certified for production and 15 were built, of which one survives to this date in excellent condition. There were even talks with a South African company involving plans for exports or even transfer of production to that country, but they were never realized. The company ceased production in 1975.

See also 
 Reliant Robin: a similar car from the UK

References 
 L.S. Skartsis and G.A. Avramidis, "Made in Greece", Typorama, Patras, Greece (2003)  (republished by the University of Patras Science Park, 2007). 
L.S. Skartsis, "Greek Vehicle & Machine Manufacturers 1800 to present: A Pictorial History", Marathon (2012)  (eBook)
 M. Arvanitopoulos, "Istoria tou Ellinikou Motosykletismou (History of the Motorcycle in Greece)", Mototech, Athens (2006) . 
 K. Bitsikokos, "Affordable cars made in Greece", Auto Bild (Hellas), issue 22, Feb 29, 2008.
 Petros Konstantinou archive.

Three-wheeled motor vehicles
Defunct motor vehicle manufacturers of Greece
Manufacturing companies based in Athens